"Diamond Duck" is a song by Slovene duo Maraaya and their sixth single released by Warner Music on 22 September 2017 and ten days later in Slovenia. The song talks about the current political situation around the world. The song's title also refers to the sporting term in cricket.

Background 
With this song they made a career turnover when they signed the contract with Warner Music and became the first Slovenian artists to sign with one of the "big three" recording companies and great chance to enter on worldwide music stage. This is the 341th song in a row written or co-written by Raay.

Music video 
Like their previous video for "It's Complicated", this one was also shot with Estonian Vita Pictura Productions. The video displays the lyrics in a subtitle style along with emoji symbols.

Formats and track listings 

Digital download
"Diamond Duck" – 2:28

Credits and personnel 

 Raay – music
 Marjetka Vovk – vocals

Charts

Weekly charts

Release history

References 

2017 songs
2017 singles